ARN is a group of commercial radio stations around Australia. It includes the Pure Gold, KIIS Network, CADA, ARN Regional and iHeartRadio brands.

The company operates the ARN News service in Australia, which uses international correspondents and source news stories from AAP in Australia, CNN from the United States and Sky News and IRN from the United Kingdom. ARN has newsrooms in Sydney, Melbourne, Canberra, Brisbane and Adelaide.

Originally ARN was a joint venture of Australian media conglomerate APN News & Media and United States radio company iHeartMedia (formerly Clear Channel Communications). On 19 February 2014, it was reported that APN News & Media had agreed to purchase Clear Channel's 50% stake in the ARN. As a result, ARN is now fully owned by Here, There & Everywhere (formerly APN News & Media). The company continues to operate the Australian version of iHeartRadio.

Until 2014, ARN also included New Zealand radio networks Newstalk ZB, Classic Hits FM, ZM, Radio Sport, Radio Hauraki, Easy Mix, Flava and Coast under umbrella company The Radio Network. These are now part of the New Zealand Media and Entertainment.

In August 2021, the company removed the words 'Australian Radio Network' from its name, now being known as simply ARN. Three months later, in November 2021, Here, There & Everywhere, ARN's parent company, purchased Grant Broadcasters, who intend to integrate it with its own business by January 2022. The deal was finalized on January 4, 2022.

Assets

ARN operates 58 radio stations, targeting the 25-to-54-year-old demographic. These stations include
the top 40 (CHR), adult contemporary, and active rock-formatted KIIS Network
the classic hits and oldies-formatted Pure Gold Network
the rhythmic top 40 and urban contemporary-formatted CADA
joint venture stations Mix 106.3 and hit104.7 in Canberra with Southern Cross Austereo
other radio stations via DAB+ digital radio and iHeartRadio
46 radio stations acquired from Grant Broadcasters

KIIS Network
A vibrant network alive with influential personalities who energise, engage and excite, immersing audiences in the best music their city has to offer.

Pure Gold Network
An iconic network making audiences feel young, positive and full of life, immersing listeners with the Pure Gold hits they know and love.

Other stations

Digital radio
ARN also broadcasts a number of digital only radio stations.

Former stations

See also 
 List of radio stations in Australia

References

External links 
 ARN, Australia
 New Zealand Media and Entertainment, New Zealand
 Clear Channel UK
 Clear Channel International
 Mean Fiddler accepts Clear Channel takeover bid, BBC News
 All BBC News stories for Clear Channel

 
Here, There & Everywhere (company)
Australian radio networks